Li Xiaoming (born 19 January 1996) is a Chinese footballer who currently plays for China League One side Suzhou Dongwu.

Club career
Li Xiaoming was born in Shanghai. He started his professional football career in January 2015 when he was loaned to Shanghai Shenhua's satellite team CF Crack's in the Primera Regional de la Comunidad Valenciana. He returned to Shanghai Shenhua in July 2015. On 15 January 2016, he was loaned to Chinese Super League side Henan Jianye for one plus one year as part of Bi Jinhao's transfer deal. On 5 March 2016, Li made his Super League debut in the first match of 2016 season against Shanghai SIPG. He scored his first senior goal on 6 May 2016 in a 4–3 away defeat against Hebei China Fortune. He played 21 league matches in the 2016 season and won the title of Chinese Football Association Young Player of the Year Award. Li's loan deal at Henan was ended in advance at the end of 2016 season. He was loaned to China League One side Shenzhen FC for one season on 28 February 2017. In January 2018, Li returned to Shanghai Shenhua for the 2018 season. On 2 March 2018, he made his debut for the club in a 1–1 home draw against Changchun Yatai, coming on for Sun Shilin in the 86th minute.

On 14 February 2019, Li transferred to newly-relegated China League One side Changchun Yatai. After a mistake-filled 12-match spell at the club, Li was sent out on loan to fellow second-tier side Nantong Zhiyun, then-managed by Englishman  Gary White.

On 23 October 2020, Li loaned to Suzhou Dongwu.

Career statistics
.

Honours

Individual
Chinese Football Association Young Player of the Year: 2016

References

External links
 

1996 births
Living people
Association football midfielders
Association football defenders
Chinese footballers
Footballers from Shanghai
Shanghai Shenhua F.C. players
Henan Songshan Longmen F.C. players
Shenzhen F.C. players
Changchun Yatai F.C. players
Nantong Zhiyun F.C. players
Chinese Super League players
China League One players
Chinese expatriate footballers
Expatriate footballers in Spain
Chinese expatriate sportspeople in Spain